The 2007 UCI Women's Road World Cup was the tenth edition of the UCI Women's Road World Cup. Eight of the twelve races from the 2006 World Cup were retained and one new race was added to give a total of nine races. The races that were left off the calendar were the New Zealand World Cup, GP Castilla y Leon, L'Heure D'Or Féminine and the Lowland International Rotterdam Tour. The Dutch race the Ronde van Drenthe was the sole addition.

Races

UCI Women's Teams

Point standings

Points system
Riders earned points as follows:

Teams earned the points of their best placed four riders.
The final round earned double points

Individuals 

Final standings (last updated on September 16, 2007).

Teams 
Final standings (last updated on September 1, 2007).

Teams earned the points of their best placed four riders.
The final round earned double points

External links
Official site

 
World Cup, UCI Women's Road Cycling
UCI Women's Road World Cup